George Tobias Flom (April 12, 1871 – January 4, 1960) was an American professor of linguistics and author of numerous reference books.

Background
George Tobias Flom was born in Utica, Dane County, Wisconsin. His grandfather had immigrated to the U.S. from Aurland in Sogn og Fjordane in Norway at the beginning of the 1840s. Flom studied at the University of Wisconsin in Madison from 1889 to 1893, received his master's degree from Vanderbilt University in Nashville, Tennessee in 1894, and studied in Copenhagen and Leipzig from 1898 to 1899. He received his doctorate from Columbia University in 1900 for a thesis on the Nordic influence on the Scots language.

Career
Flom was a professor of Scandinavian languages and literature at the University of Iowa (1900–1909) and at the University of Illinois (1909–1927). In 1911 he was an organizer of the Society for the Advancement of Scandinavian Study and served as editor of that society’s journal. He was also an associate editor of the Journal of English and Germanic Philology. He was a linguist and a member of the American Philological Society. In 1936, he was the president of the Linguistic Society of America. His areas of expertise included Scandinavian paleography and philology, Norse literature and comparative linguistics relating to English, German and the Scandinavian languages.

As an author, articles by Flom frequently appears in the literary magazine Symra. Flom was the author of A History of Norwegian Immigration to the United States: From the Earliest Beginning Down to the Year 1848. In this 1909 study, Flom laid out the establishment of early Norwegian immigrant settlement in North America starts with the settlement of Orange County, New York by Norwegian immigrants, known as "Sloopers." The study follows the journey of Norwegian immigrants as they settled in communities principally located in Illinois, Wisconsin and Iowa.

Flom was a member of the Norwegian Academy of Science and Letters, and he was knighted by 1 Class of the Royal Norwegian Order of St. Olav in 1939. George T. Flom Library at the University of Illinois at Urbana-Champaign contains the former personal library of Flom. It consisted largely of collections of Danish, Swedish, Old Norse, Icelandic, Faroese, and Norwegian language, literature, and culture.

Selected bibliography
Scandinavian Influence on Southern Lowland Scotch (1900)
Chapters on Scandinavian Immigration to Iowa (1906)
A History of the Scandinavian Studies in American Universities, Together with a Bibliography (1907)
A History of Norwegian Immigration to the United States: From the Earliest Beginning Down to the Year 1848 (1909)
The Kensington Rune-Stone: An Address (1910)
The Phonology of the Dialect of Aurland, Norway (1915)
The Language of the Konungs Skuggsja (Speculum Regale) (1923)
Introductory Old English Grammar and Reader (1930)
Journal of English and Germanic Philology (1930)
Old Norwegian General Law of the Gulathing: According to Codex Gl.k.S. 1154 Folio (1937)
The Morphology of the Dialect on Aurland in Sogn, Norway (1944)
Bjornson's Synnove Solbakken (1944)

References

External links
“University of Illinois Archives - George T. Flom Papers”
“The Promise of America – George Tobias Flom”
”Journal of English and Germanic Philology”
”American Philological Association”
Linguistic Society of America”
 
 

Linguists from the United States
Anglo-Saxon studies scholars
American people of Norwegian descent
Germanic studies scholars
Linguists of Germanic languages
People from Christiana, Dane County, Wisconsin
University of Wisconsin–Madison alumni
University of Illinois Urbana-Champaign faculty
1871 births
1960 deaths
Members of the Norwegian Academy of Science and Letters
People from Urbana, Illinois
Linguistic Society of America presidents